Parc Bazilescu is a metro station in northern Bucharest, serving Bucharest Metro Line M4. The station was opened on 1 July 2011 as part of the extension from 1 Mai. On 31 March 2017 the line was extended to Straulesti.

References

Bucharest Metro stations
Railway stations opened in 2011
2011 establishments in Romania